Nigel Hall (born 23 November 1978 in Westport, New Zealand) is a New Zealand rugby union player. A prop forward, Hall played for Otago before joining Nottingham. In December 2008 he joined Newport Gwent Dragons. Hall retired from rugby in October 2011 due to injury.

References

External links
Newport Gwent Dragons profile

1978 births
Living people
Dragons RFC players
New Zealand expatriate sportspeople in Wales
New Zealand rugby union players
Rugby union players from Westport, New Zealand
Rugby union props